Pipi or Pipis may refer to:

Plebidonax deltoides, an edible clam known as pipi in parts of Australia
Paphies australis, a mollusc endemic to New Zealand
Pipi A, a High Priest of Ptah during the Ancient Egyptian 21st Dynasty
Neterkheperre Meryptah called Pipi II, another 21st Dynasty High Priest of Ptah
Pipi, a transcription (ΠΙΠΙ) into Greek of the Tetragrammaton
Pipis, an enemy from the video game Deltarune
Pipi Natural Bridge, a geological formation in the Central African Republic
Litsea garciae, a tree native to Southeast Asia locally called pipi
Pipi (footballer, born 1915), full name Serafim Pinto Ribeiro Júnior, Brazilian football forward
Pipi (footballer, born 2003), full name Takuhiro Nakai, Japanese football midfielder

See also
Peepee (disambiguation)
Pippi (disambiguation)
Pippy (disambiguation)
Athanasios Pipis (died 1821), Greek commander in the Greek War of Independence